Mehdi Benhamouda (born 2 January 1995) is a French cyclist, who currently rides for UCI ProTeam . He was diagnosed with diabetes at the age of 13.

References

External links

1995 births
Living people
People from Carcassonne
French male cyclists
Sportspeople from Aude
Cyclists from Occitania (administrative region)
People with type 1 diabetes
French sportspeople of African descent